Revelations is an album by McCoy Tyner released on the Blue Note label. It was Tyner's first solo piano album since Echoes of a Friend (1972) and first Blue Note recording (apart from 1985's It's About Time with Jackie McLean) since Asante (1970). It was recorded in October 1988 and features thirteen solo performances by Tyner recorded at Merkin Hall. The Allmusic review by Scott Yanow states that "This is a rather special project from one of the finest jazz pianists of the past 35 years".

Track listing 
 "Yesterdays" (Harbach, Kern) - 4:40  
 "You Taught My Heart to Sing" (Cahn, Tyner) - 5:12  
 "In a Mellow Tone" (Ellington, Gabler) - 3:36  
 "View from the Hill" - 4:03  
 "Lazy Bird" (Coltrane) - 3:55  
 "Don't Blame Me" (Fields, McHugh) - 5:41  
 "Rio" - 4:43  
 "How Deep Is the Ocean?" (Berlin) - 3:59  
 "Someone to Watch Over Me" (Gershwin, Gershwin) - 3:35  
 "Contemplation" - 5:27  
 "Autumn Leaves" (Kosma, Mercer, Prévert) - 4:08 Bonus track on CD 
 "Peresina" - 6:08 Bonus track on CD
 "When I Fall in Love" (Heyman, Young) - 4:07 Bonus track on CD
All compositions by McCoy Tyner except as indicated
Recorded at Merkin Hall, NYC, October 25 (tracks 2, 5, 6, 9 & 10), 26 (tracks 1, 3, 7, 8 & 13) and 27 (tracks 4, 11 & 12), 1988

Personnel 
 McCoy Tyner: piano

References

1989 live albums
McCoy Tyner live albums
Blue Note Records live albums
Instrumental albums